Trofarello railway station serves the town and comune of Trofarello, in the Piedmont region, northwestern Italy. The station is located at the end of Via Roma, near the large Piazza Europa.

Services

References

Railway stations in the Metropolitan City of Turin
Railway stations opened in 1849
1849 establishments in the Kingdom of Sardinia

Railway stations in Italy opened in 1849